Shaun William George Ryder (born 23 August 1962) is an English singer/songwriter and poet. As lead singer of Happy Mondays, he was a leading figure in the Madchester cultural scene during the late 1980s and early 1990s. In 1993, he formed Black Grape with former Happy Mondays dancer Bez. He was the runner-up on the tenth series of I'm a Celebrity...Get Me Out of Here!.

Early life
Shaun William George Ryder was born on 23 August 1962 in Little Hulton, Lancashire, the son of nurse Linda and postman Derek (who would later become Happy Mondays' tour manager). By the age of 13, he had left school to work on a building site.

Musical career

Happy Mondays
Ryder's early years as a singer for Happy Mondays were depicted in the 2002 British comedy-drama film 24 Hour Party People, a semi-fictional account of Factory Records and the Manchester music scene of the 1980s and early 1990s. In the film, Ryder is portrayed by Danny Cunningham.

Ryder has taken part in two reformations of Happy Mondays (1999–2000 and 2004–present). He also released a solo album, Amateur Night in the Big Top, in 2003.

In 2000, following the Big Day Out Festival in Australia with Happy Mondays, Ryder stayed on in Perth, Western Australia with Pete Carroll, who had a record label called Offworld Sounds. While in Perth he recorded Amateur Night in the Big Top, an album of punk electronica with Carroll, Shane Norton, Stephen Mallinder from Cabaret Voltaire and Lucky Oceans from American country band Asleep at the Wheel. UnCut called it, "exhilarating stuff. Another wildly implausible Ryder comeback" while Ministry of Sound said it was "A remarkable album. The most vitriolic lyrics this side of Dylan's 'Ballad of a Thin Man' and Sex Pistols 'EMI. The album was recorded quickly during a few late night sessions in Carroll's garage studio during an extremely hot Perth summer. The album was subsequently released on Offworld Sounds.

In 2004, Happy Mondays reunited to play a comeback gig called "Get Loaded in the Park" on Clapham Common, with only original members. Two years later they released the single "Playground Superstar", featured in the football film Goal, which was released after Bez had won Celebrity Big Brother. In 2007 Happy Mondays produced the album, Uncle Dysfunktional. In 2009 he made a cameo appearance as himself in Channel 4 drama Shameless.

Black Grape
In 1995 Ryder launched his new project, Black Grape. Its first release, It's Great When You're Straight... Yeah, topped the British album chart for a week. However, the follow-up album, Stupid Stupid Stupid, did not achieve the same critical nor commercial success, and the group split in 1998. The group reformed briefly in 2010, and released a single in 2015, and in August 2017, released Pop Voodoo, their first full album since 1997.

Other work
Ryder collaborated with Intastella in 1993 on the track	'Can You Fly Like You Mean It?' and in 1997, Ryder featured on the Agent Provocateur album Where the Wild Things Are on track 'Agent Dan'. 

He appeared on British tenor Russell Watson's 2001 debut album The Voice, lending his vocals to a cover version of the Freddie Mercury and Montserrat Caballé song "Barcelona".

In 2004, Ryder had a voice acting role in the video game Grand Theft Auto: San Andreas in which he played Maccer, a washed-up, masturbation-addicted musician who was planning a major comeback tour.

Ryder appeared in Peter Kay's "Is This the Way to Amarillo?" charity music video in 2005. Also in 2005, he collaborated with Gorillaz on "Dare", a song on their Demon Days album. Chris Evans stated at the 2006 Brit Awards that the song was originally called "It's There", but was changed as Ryder's thick Mancunian accent made him pronounce the word "there" as "dare".

In 2023 Ryder collaborated with The Lottery Winners on the track "Money" from their album Anxiety Replacement Therapy.  This track was released as a single on 16 February 2023.

Other work

Writing
Ryder wrote a column for the Daily Sport, in which he commented on current events and celebrities. The column was ghostwritten with journalist John Warburton, who would write a book about the Happy Mondays reunion in the late 1990s, and co-credited it to Ryder. He said he "didn't really have anything to do with it at all," explaining that Warburton had approached him to write a biography. Ryder said he was not interested in the idea at the time, but allowed him to accompany the band on tour and document the proceedings. 

In 2011, Ryder published his autobiography, Twisting My Melon: The Autobiography. It was optioned by Granada Television and writer Danny Brocklehurst enlisted to write the screenplay.

Television
In 2004 he was the subject of Richard Macer's BBC3 documentary Shaun Ryder: The Ecstasy and the Agony. In 2006, he appeared in Shameless (series 6 episode 3) as himself. 

Ryder was a contestant on the tenth series of ITV's reality game show I'm a Celebrity...Get Me Out of Here! in 2010, where he finished second behind Stacey Solomon. In January 2011 Ryder appeared on the first series of the ITV programme That Sunday Night Show, and again on the second series in September 2011. He collaborated with fellow I'm a Celebrity contestant Stacey Solomon at the 2011 National Television Awards.

In 2013, Ryder hosted the television show Shaun Ryder on UFOs on The History Channel UK. He has a lifelong interest in UFOs and claims that he has personally encountered space aliens, stating that he saw a UFO for the first time in 1978.

In 2016, he appeared on Would I Lie to You?, being asked if he had trained his cat to wink.  

In 2017 Ryder appeared on Celebrity Juice as a member of Fearne Cotton's team. The next year he starred in ITVs 100 years younger in 21 days and appeared on Celebrity Mastermind, with the specialist subject of Manchester.

In 2019, Ryder was interviewed on Sam Delaney's News Thing. In August 2020, Ryder appeared in BBC Two comedy Mandy created by Diane Morgan in which he portrayed a fictional version of himself.

Bakery
In March 1972 just as the 70's began to affect every day life Ryder began a new enterprise in the South West of England with his brother Keith. Fond of a bun or three they pie-n-eared Ryders Bakery and opened the first outlet in Dawlish, South Devon.  Locals soon got to appreciate the love and care that the Ryder brand maintained in all it's product with regular customer Colin saying "these are simply the best buns I have ever had the delight to eat".  Ryders success has grown from strength to strength with new branches opening throughout Devon - the latest replacing Thomas' bakery in Bovey Tracey

Personal life
Ryder has six children. For some time, he was addicted to heroin, saying he overcame it by taking up cycling.

Ryder contested contracts he drew up with his Black Grape management team, compiled in 1993. Following his dismissal of the company, they sued him for £160,000. The income from his £30,000 a year Daily Sport column went solely to cover his costs. His appearance on I'm a Celebrity...Get Me Out of Here! (2010) and a £130,000 book deal financed Ryder out of the contract.

Ryder was diagnosed with ADHD and dyslexia later in life, saying in the 60s and 70s there was "no such thing as learning difficulties". "When I was at school they didn't know about ADHD, there were just four sets, one being the brightest and four being crowd control"... so "for the first 40-something years of my life I didn't know I had it [ADHD]".

In 2021 he took part in Channel 4's Stand Up and Deliver; mentored by Jason Manford, he developed his own stand-up set. Manford explained in an interview “Shaun’s got severe ADHD, so remembering things, collecting information and taking on new thoughts, it’s been a real challenge."

Ryder took part in  Channel 4's Fame in the Family; where Ryder discovered three long lost relatives, Tracey and James had the most direct blood connection, both second cousins.

Discography

Solo albums
2003 – Amateur Night in the Big Top
2021 – Visits from Future Technology

Compilation
2010 – Shaun William Ryder XXX: 30 Years of Bellyaching

Videography
Solo
1996 – "Don't Take My Kindness for Weakness" (with The Heads)
2001 – "Barcelona" (with Russell Watson)
2003 – "Scooter Girl"
2005 – "DARE" (with Gorillaz)
2005 – "Is This the Way to Amarillo?"

Awards
NME Single of the Year 1996 – Black Grape's "Reverend Black Grape"
Godlike Genius – NME Awards, 2000
John Peel Music Innovation Award (for Gorillaz) – Shockwaves NME Awards 2006

References

Bibliography

External links

Shaun Ryder narrowly escapes a heavy fine after giving evidence at a trial
Shaun Ryder was caricature of himself in Happy Mondays
Straight but not great: Shaun Ryder
Interview with Shaun Ryder in LeftLion magazine 2007
Shaun Ryder at Biogs.com

1962 births
Living people
Male actors from Manchester
Alternative rock singers
Alternative dance musicians
Black Grape members
British alternative rock musicians
English male video game actors
English columnists
English dance musicians
English male singer-songwriters
English television personalities
Happy Mondays members
Music in Salford
Musicians from Manchester
People from Little Hulton
Male actors from Salford
Britpop musicians
Madchester musicians
I'm a Celebrity...Get Me Out of Here! (British TV series) participants